HMOX1 (heme oxygenase 1 gene) is a human gene that encodes for the enzyme heme oxygenase 1. Heme oxygenase (abbreviated HMOX or HO) mediates the first step of heme catabolism, it cleaves heme to form biliverdin.

The HMOX gene is located on the long (q) arm of chromosome 22 at position 12.3, from base pair 34,101,636 to base pair 34,114,748.

Related conditions 
 Heme oxygenase-1 deficiency

Heme oxygenase 

Heme oxygenase, an essential enzyme in heme catabolism, cleaves heme to form biliverdin, carbon monoxide, and ferrous iron. The biliverdin is subsequently converted to bilirubin by biliverdin reductase. Heme oxygenase activity is induced by its substrate heme and by various nonheme substances. Heme oxygenase occurs as 2 isozymes, an inducible heme oxygenase-1 and a constitutive heme oxygenase-2. HMOX1 and HMOX2 belong to the heme oxygenase family.

See also 
 HMOX2
 Focal segmental glomerulosclerosis

References

Further reading

External links
 

EC 1.14.99